Anne Le Ny (born 15 December 1962) is a French actress, screenwriter and film director.

Filmography

Actress

Screenwriter or director

Theatre

References

French film directors
French women film directors
Living people
French film actresses
French television actresses
1962 births
20th-century French actresses
21st-century French actresses
French people of Breton descent
French women screenwriters
French screenwriters
French stage actresses